Joseph and Esther Phillips Plantation, also known as The Old Ritter Farm, is a historic home and farm located in West Fallowfield Township, Chester County, Pennsylvania, USA. The plantation was established in 1813 when the house was built. The house is a 2½-story, five bay, stuccoed limestone structure. It is built in the Georgian "I"-plan. It has a Gothic Revival style porch added in the 1850s. Other contributing buildings are two stone and frame bank barns, a stone octagonal smokehouse, a frame carriage house and workshop, and a two-story, stone spring house.

It was added to the National Register of Historic Places in 1985.

References

Houses on the National Register of Historic Places in Pennsylvania
Georgian architecture in Pennsylvania
Gothic Revival architecture in Pennsylvania
Houses completed in 1813
Houses in Chester County, Pennsylvania
National Register of Historic Places in Chester County, Pennsylvania